The following is a list of dams in Hokkaido, Japan.

List

See also

References 

Hokkaido